"Happy Holiday" (sometimes performed as "Happy Holidays") is a popular song composed by Irving Berlin in 1942 and published the following year.

History
"Happy Holiday" was introduced by Bing Crosby and Marjorie Reynolds (dubbed by Martha Mears) in the 1942 film Holiday Inn in a scene when the Inn opens for the first time. While it is commonly regarded as a Christmas song, in the film it is performed on New Year's Eve, and expresses a wish for the listener to enjoy "happy holidays" throughout the entire year.  It contains certain melodic material first used in Berlin's earlier song "Easter Parade".

Jo Stafford was the first to release it on a Christmas album, on her album of the same name in 1955.

The Kay Thompson song "The Holiday Season" is sometimes paired with "Happy Holiday" as a medley. This was first popularized by Andy Williams (whom Thompson herself discovered and mentored). Other artists who have covered the "Happy Holiday"/"Holiday Season" medley include The Manhattan Transfer, She & Him, and Michael W. Smith.

Renditions

Bing Crosby recorded the song on June 1, 1942, for Decca Records with John Scott Trotter and His Orchestra, plus The Music Maids and Hal. Crosby also used the song as the introduction to his long-running A Christmas Sing with Bing radio shows.
Jo Stafford on her album of the same name in 1955.
Jackie Gleason, on his 1956 album Merry Christmas
Steve Lawrence and Eydie Gorme, on their 1964 album That Holiday Feeling!
Andy Williams (in a medley with "The Holiday Season"), on his 1963 album The Andy Williams Christmas Album
Peggy Lee, on her 1965 album Happy Holiday
Percy Faith, on his 1966 album Christmas Is...
Living Strings and Living Voices, on their 1968 album White Christmas
Nelson Riddle, on the 1970 album Avon Christmas 1970
The Carpenters (as part of a medley), on their 1984 album An Old-Fashioned Christmas
Johnny Mathis (in a medley with "Caroling, Caroling"), on his 1986 album Christmas Eve with Johnny Mathis
Sarah Vaughan (in a medley with "White Christmas"), on the 1989 album Hallmark Presents Carols of Christmas
The Manhattan Transfer (in a medley with "The Holiday Season"), on their 1992 album The Christmas Album
Perry Como (in a medley with "We Need a Little Christmas"), on his 1994 album Perry Como's Christmas Concert
Acoustix, on their 1999 album Cool Yule
Barry Manilow (in a medley with "White Christmas"), on his 2002 album A Christmas Gift of Love
Dionne Warwick, on her 2004 album My Favorite Time of the Year
Michael W. Smith (in a medley with "The Holiday Season"), on his 2014 album The Spirit of Christmas
She & Him (in a medley with "The Holiday Season"), on their 2016 album Christmas Party

Charts

Andy Williams "Happy Holiday/The Holiday Season" version

References

Holiday songs
1942 songs
Andy Williams songs
Bing Crosby songs
Jo Stafford songs
Peggy Lee songs
American Christmas songs
Songs written for films
Songs written by Irving Berlin